Robby Brink (born 21 July 1971), is a former South African rugby union player who played for the South Africa national rugby union team. He played as a flanker.

Career
Brink played for the  schools team at the 1989 Craven Week tournament and after school continued his studies at the University of Cape Town.

He was part of the South African squad that won the 1995 Rugby World Cup where he played in two matches, the only two caps that he won.

Test history

See also
List of South Africa national rugby union players – Springbok no. 626

References

External links

South African rugby union players
South Africa international rugby union players
1971 births
Living people
Rugby union flankers
Rugby union players from Pretoria
Western Province (rugby union) players
Ulster Rugby players